Captain Disaster is Belgian singer-songwriter Ferre Grignard's second solo album. Released in 1968, it was a dramatic departure from the mainly skiffle-based Ring, Ring, I've Got to Sing.

Track listing

Release history

Personnel
Ferre Grignard: Vocals
Instrumental Group
George "Toet" Smits: Guitar, Harmonica
Rikki Stein: Production
Jean-Claude Petit: Arrangements
Bernard Estardy: Sound Engineer
Raoul Vandenboom: Front Liner Photo
Jules Halfant: Art Direction
Jean-Pierre Leloir: Photography

References

External links
 Discogs.com entry

Ferre Grignard albums
Barclay (record label) albums
Psychedelic rock albums
1968 albums